The Xerox 9700 was a high-end laser printer manufactured by Xerox Corporation beginning in 1977.  Based on the Xerox 9200 copier, the 9700 printed at 300 dots-per-inch on cut-sheet paper at up to two pages per second (pps), one- or two-sided, that is simplex or duplex, landscape or portrait.

Description 
The 9700 was intended for high-volume applications. It included a disk drive and a modified Digital Equipment Corporation (DEC) PDP-11/34 as a print controller and rasterizer. It could connect to an IBM mainframe via a parallel channel.  It offered an input tray that could hold up to 2500 sheets of paper (20lb bond/75gsm) and an auxiliary input tray for an additional 400 sheets.  It had two output stackers, each capable of holding 1500 sheets.  An operator control console consisted of a CRT display terminal and keyboard.  It optionally included a 9 track tape drive which could be used to load documents for printing, to supply software and bitmapped fonts, or run backups.

Historic importance
In 1980, Richard Stallman and some other hackers at the MIT AI Lab were refused access to the source code for the software of a newly installed Xerox 9700. Stallman had modified the software for the Lab's previous laser printer (the XGP, Xerographic Printer), so it electronically messaged a user when the person's job was printed, and would message all logged-in users waiting for print jobs if the printer was jammed. Not being able to add these features to the new printer was a major inconvenience, as the printer was on a different floor from most of the users. This experience convinced Stallman of people's need to be able to freely modify the software they use, thus the launch of the Free Software movement.

See also 
 DocuTech

References

External links 
 Xerox 9700 brochure

Xerox
Computer printers
Non-impact printing
Products introduced in 1977